Louise Rousseau (1910-1981) was an American screenwriter known primarily for penning B Westerns in the 1940s.

Biography 
Louise was born in Provincetown, Massachusetts, to Louis Rousseau (a famous French tenor) and Frances Simkins (daughter of a prominent Texas lawyer).

Her parents split up when she was a baby; her father returned to France, and she was sent to Texas to live with her aunts. She later reconnected with her father in 1932.

After graduating high school at age 15, she studied chemistry at the Massachusetts Institute of Technology. After school, she became a secretary to the manager of the Rivoli Theatre in New York before moving on to Pathe, where she became the assistant of Frank Donovan.

Early on in her Hollywood career, she worked as a director (one of very few women at the time) of newsreels at Pathe-RKO. She later made a living writing low-budget Westerns — at least until she was called to testify before the House Unamerican Activities Committee in 1951.

Selected filmography 

 Air Hostess (1949) 
 Mississippi Rhythm (1949) 
 Prince of the Plains (1949) 
 Under Colorado Skies (1947) 
 Over the Santa Fe Trail (1947) 
 Lone Star Moonlight (1946)
 West of the Alamo (1946) 
 Gunning for Vengeance (1946) 
 Moon Over Montana (1946) 
 The Lonesome Trail (1945)
 Fighting Bill Carson (1945) 
 Riders of the Dawn (1945) 
 Rhythm Round-Up (1945) 
 Rockin' in the Rockies (1945) 
 Swing Hostess (1944) 
 Fuzzy Settles Down (1944)

References 

American women screenwriters
1910 births
1980 deaths
Screenwriters from Massachusetts
American women film directors
20th-century American women writers
20th-century American screenwriters